The Vestas V90-2MW is a three-bladed upwind horizontal-axis wind turbine designed and manufactured by Vestas with versions for wind classes IIA and IIIA.

See also
 Vestas V90-3MW

External links

 Official product page

Vestas wind turbines